Bulbostylis lichtensteiniana is a species of flowering plant in the sedge family, Cyperaceae, that is endemic to Saint Helena. Unlike other species native to Saint Helena, such as Bulbostylis neglecta, Bulbostylis lichtensteiniana does not show obvious signs of decline due to the spread of invasive plants. However the lack of decline is partially attributed to Bulbostylis lichtensteiniana being the only endemic plant to have expanded into new anthropogenic habitats.

References 

Flora of Saint Helena
Plants described in 1837
lichtensteiniana